= Metaon =

Town of ancient Lesbos

Coordinates: 38°59′05″N 26°27′10″E

Metaon (Ancient Greek: Μέταον) was a town of ancient Lesbos.

The site of Metaon is tentatively located near modern Ta Meti/Plagia.
